Luciana Diniz (born 11 October 1970) is a Brazilian-born Portuguese equestrian whose discipline is show jumping. She currently ranks thirteenth on the FEI Rolex Ranking List. In addition to her show jumping work, Diniz is also known for G.R.O.W., an "informal education philosophy" that teaches adults and children. She is also started a documentary series on her horses called the Hoofprint Series.

Luciana  went to the 2016 Olympic Summer Games in Rio de Janeiro as an individual competitor for Portugal with Fit For Fun.

Biography 

Diniz was born in São Paulo, Brazil. She is the daughter of former Brazilian dressage rider and eight-time champion Lica Diniz and polo player Arnaldo Diniz. Her two brothers, Andre and Fabio, followed their father and are now the top two Brazilian polo players in the world.  She has a third brother, Arnaldo, who is an amateur racer and won the Brazilian Amateur Championships in 2014. Originally Diniz began with dressage like her mother and rode the family horse Marko until his death when she was eleven. Luciana quit riding for a month before returning and discovering show jumping. She won the Children's Jumping Championships at the age of twelve and the Junior Jumping Championships at the ages of fourteen and eighteen.

Diniz left home at eighteen and trained at various stables of show jumping champions including Alwin Schockemoele before starting her own business in Fürstenau, Lower Saxony. At the 2012 Summer Olympics, Diniz came in seventh individually. In 2015, she was the overall winner of the Longines Global Champions Tour.

Personal life 
Diniz have twin sons, Pedro and Paulo She currently lives in Sankt Augustin. She is known for her intelligence as well and is fluent in five languages. She has also created an "informal education philosophy" called G.R.O.W., which is supposed to teach people—mostly children—how to become better individuals and improve society. In addition to helping people, G.R.O.W. also trains horses—mostly for show jumping—and sells them to riders that she thinks best suit them.

Top Horses

Sponsors 
She is sponsored by Bruno Delgrange Sellier, Deserata Show Jackets, and Roeckl Gloves.

References

External links 
 

Portuguese female equestrians
Brazilian female equestrians
Portuguese people of Brazilian descent
1970 births
Sportspeople from São Paulo
Living people
Olympic equestrians of Brazil
Olympic equestrians of Portugal
Equestrians at the 2004 Summer Olympics
Equestrians at the 2012 Summer Olympics
Equestrians at the 2016 Summer Olympics
Equestrians at the 2020 Summer Olympics